Tricholoma aurantium, commonly known as the golden orange tricholoma, is a mushroom of the agaric genus Tricholoma. Originally described by Jacob Christian Schäffer in 1774, it was transferred to the genus Tricholoma by Adalbert Ricken in 1915.

Description
Fresh specimens are sticky or slimy. The cap color is orange to dull reddish-orange. Parts that have been handled bruise dark red. The surface texture ranges from smooth to covered with scattered appressed fibrils and scales. The closely spaced gills are whitish, but develop brownish to reddish-brown stains in maturity. They are narrowly attached to the stipe, sometimes by a notch. Its surface is covered with dense orangish scales that terminate in a line near the top of the stipe, where it is white. The white, mealy tasting flesh does not change color with injury.

The spore print is white. Spores are smooth, ellipsoid, and inamyloid, measuring 5–6 by 3–4 µm. The mushroom is inedible.

Habitat and distribution
The fungus grows in a mycorrhizal relationships with various species of conifers. Fruit bodies grow scattered or in groups or clusters on the ground.

Tricholoma aurantium is widely distributed in North America. It is found in Asia (India, Pakistan). The ectomycorrhizae of T. aurantium has been reported with Pinus wallichiana and Abies pindrow in Pakistan, and with silver fir (Abies alba) in Italy.

Chemistry
Tricholoma aurantium fruitbodies contains the novel diterpene lactone compounds trichoaurantianolides A, B, C and D. The bright orange-red color is due to the benzotropolone pigment aurantricholone. The first total synthesis of trichoaurantianolides C and D was reported in 2015.

See also
List of North American Tricholoma
List of Tricholoma species

References

aurantium
Fungi described in 1774
Fungi of Asia
Fungi of Europe
Fungi of North America
Inedible fungi
Taxa named by Jacob Christian Schäffer